Nightwing is the fifth studio album by Swedish black metal band Marduk. It was recorded and mixed at The Abyss between October and November 1997 and released in April 1998 by Osmose Productions. The theme of the album was blood, as the band's following, war-related studio album's Panzer Division Marduk would be fire, and La Grande Danse Macabre would be death, forming a trilogy of "Blood, Fire and Death," an homage to Bathory's Blood Fire Death album.

In 2008, Nightwing was re-released with a new mastering, an alternative cover artwork and a live DVD of a show in Rotterdam 1998.

Themes
On Nightwing, the theme is blood, divided in two parts: The first in the Satanic ways customary of Marduk's lyrics, but the second part tells the history of Vlad 'Tepes' Draculea, the Impaler of Wallachia who fought against the Ottoman invasion on Europe, giving continuity to the history started on "Deme Quaden Thyrane", a track from their third studio album, Opus Nocturne, and continued with "Dracul Va Domni Din Nou In Transylvania" from Heaven Shall Burn... When We Are Gathered. "Deme Quaden Thyrane" appears also here, rearranged, with Legion's vocals and a little change in the lyrics at the end. The final song of the album, "Anno Domini 1476", ends with a sample from the fascist march "La Luptă, Muncitori" ("The Legionary Worker's march") by the Romanian Iron Guard.

Track listing

Re-Issue Bonus DVD
Live in Rotterdam 1998

 Of Hells Fire
 Those Of The Unlight
 Slay The Nazarene
 The Black...
 Still Fucking Dead
 Sulphur Souls
 Dreams Of Blood And Iron
 Beyond The Grace Of God

Trivia
 The chapter to which the title track belongs is uncertain, as "Nightwing" is completely absent from the track listing on the back cover of the album, despite being track 5 on the disc. Probably it is an interlude between the fast blast beat of the first chapter and the darker, slower second chapter.
 An anticipation to the chapter "Warlord of Wallachia" can be found at the end of the "Dracul Va Domni Din Nou In Transylvania" lyrics, the #7 track in Heaven Shall Burn... When We Are Gathered. The last verses are not sung, but they say "Greater stories are yet to be told".
The introduction to the track "Slay The Nazarene" is a line from the 1973 film The Wicker Man.
The main musical theme of the track "Nightwing" is a variation on the main musical theme recurring in the Subspecies films released by Full Moon Features.

Personnel
Marduk
 Legion – vocals
 Morgan Steinmeyer Håkansson – guitar
 B. War – bass
 Fredrik Andersson – drums

Guest
 Peter Tägtgren – mixing

References

1998 albums
Marduk (band) albums
Osmose Productions albums